The 2017–18 season was Lincoln City's 134th season in their history and their first season back in League Two following promotion from the 2016–17 National League. Along with League Two, the club also participated in the FA Cup, EFL Cup and EFL Trophy.

The season covers the period from 1 July 2017 to 30 June 2018.

Transfers

Transfers in

Transfers out

Loans in

Loans out

Competitions

Friendlies
As of 28 June 2017, Lincoln City have announced five pre-season friendlies against Walsall, Oxford United, Gainsborough Trinity. Lincoln United and Peterborough United.

The originally planned friendly against Oxford United was later cancelled.

League Two

League table

Results summary

Results by matchday

Matches
On 21 June 2017, the league fixtures were announced.

League Two play-offs

FA Cup

EFL Cup
On 16 June 2017, Lincoln City were drawn away to Rotherham United in the first round.

EFL Trophy
On 12 July 2017, Lincoln City were drawn in Northern Group G alongside Everton U23s, Mansfield Town and Notts County. As group winners, Lincoln City were handed a home tie against Accrington Stanley in the second round.· An away tie against Rochdale was announced for the third round.

References

Lincoln City F.C. seasons
Lincoln City